Djalma is a Portuguese given name, may refer to:
Djalma (footballer, 1918-1954), Djalma Bezerra dos Santos, Brazilian football forward
Djalma Santos (born 1929), Brazilian footballer
Djalma Dias (1939–1990), Brazilian footballer, full name Djalma Pereira Dias Júnior
Djalminha (born 1970), Brazilian footballer, son of Djalma Dias, full name Djalma Feitosa Dias
Djalma Henrique da Silva, (born 1975), Brazilian footballer
Djalma Santos Rodrigues Júnior, known as Djalma Santos (born 1976), Brazilian footballer
Djalma Braume Manuel Abel Campos (born 1987), Angolan footballer

See also
Djalmir
Hjalmar - Scandinavian variation